During the 1981–82 English football season, Brentford competed in the Football League Third Division. After losing ground in January and February 1982, just one win from the final five matches of the season ended the Bees' hopes of promotion.

Season summary 

Aside from the club record signing of £65,000 central defender Alan Whitehead, Brentford manager Fred Callaghan presided over a quiet 1981 off-season at Griffin Park. Goalkeeper Paul Priddy returned to the club for a third spell on a part-time contract as cover for David McKellar, but the club went into the season understaffed in the striking department, having lost Gary Johnson to injury in a car crash and a suitable replacement could not be found in time. Bids for midfielders John Beck, Jeff Chandler, forward David Kemp and former Brentford player Andrew McCulloch had failed to yield any transfers.

Despite going unbeaten in the first four Third Division matches of the season, a bad run of results in September and October 1981 dropped the club to just above the relegation places. Manager Callaghan acted swiftly in the transfer market, signing midfielders Stan Bowles, Chris Kamara and finally bolstering the forward line with the acquisition of Keith Bowen. The upturn in form was immediate and seven wins and one draw from a 10-match spell lifted the Bees from 18th place on 17 October to 4th on 28 December. The run included five consecutive away league wins, which equalled the club record.

Brentford began 1982 with a run in which the team took just two points from a possible 24, which dropped the club back into mid-table. Former player Gordon Sweetzer briefly returned to Griffin Park in January, but scored just one goal in 9 appearances before returning to his native Canada. The team recovered in March and things further improved after forward David Kemp was finally signed on loan in March, but he succumbed to injury after just three appearances. A 2–1 win over Chester on 24 April put the Bees in 7th position, four points behind 3rd-place Lincoln City with five matches to play. Brentford's outside chances of promotion were killed off in the following match versus Wimbledon at Griffin Park, losing 3–2, having been leading 2–0. The Bees finished the season in 8th position.

League table

Results
Brentford's goal tally listed first.

Legend

Pre-season and friendlies

Football League Third Division

FA Cup

Football League Cup 

 Sources: 100 Years of Brentford, The Big Brentford Book of the Eighties,Croxford, Lane & Waterman, p. 390-391. Statto

Playing squad 
Players' ages are as of the opening day of the 1981–82 season.

 Sources: The Big Brentford Book of the Eighties, Timeless Bees

Coaching staff

Statistics

Appearances and goals
Substitute appearances in brackets.

Players listed in italics left the club mid-season.
Source: The Big Brentford Book of the Eighties

Goalscorers 

Players listed in italics left the club mid-season.
Source: The Big Brentford Book of the Eighties

Management

Summary

Transfers & loans

Awards 
 Supporters' Player of the Year: Stan Bowles
 Players' Player of the Year: Alan Whitehead

References 

Brentford F.C. seasons
Brentford